Marcelo Cordeiro de Souza (born 4 December 1981), known as Marcelo Cordeiro or simply Cordeiro, is a Brazilian football manager and former player who played as a left back. He is the current manager of São Bento.

Club career
Born in Niterói, Rio de Janeiro, Cordeiro graduated with Vasco da Gama's youth setup, but left in the following year after the club's financial troubles. He subsequently resumed his career in the lower levels.

In 2008, after scoring 12 goals for Atlético Sorocaba, Cordeiro joined Vitória. He made his first team – and Série A – debut on 10 May, starting in a 0–2 home loss against Cruzeiro.

Cordeiro scored his first professional goals on 9 July, netting a brace in a 5–2 home routing over Botafogo. He appeared in 33 matches and scored five goals, and moved to Internacional on 9 January 2009.

Cordeiro was subsequently loaned to Botafogo and Portuguesa, and signed permanently with the latter in November 2011. He was an ever-present figure with Lusa, appearing in more than 100 matches for the club.

On 25 April 2013 Cordeiro joined Sport Recife. On 30 May of the following year he was released, and signed for Metropolitano on 4 August.

Honours
Internacional
Campeonato Gaúcho: 2009
Copa Suruga Bank: 2009

Botafogo
Campeonato Carioca: 2010

Portuguesa
Campeonato Brasileiro Série B: 2011

References

External links

Living people
1981 births
Sportspeople from Niterói
Brazilian footballers
Brazilian football managers
Association football defenders
Campeonato Brasileiro Série A players
Campeonato Brasileiro Série B players
Campeonato Brasileiro Série B managers
CR Vasco da Gama players
Clube Atlético Bragantino players
Rio Claro Futebol Clube players
Democrata Futebol Clube players
Villa Rio Esporte Clube players
Botafogo Futebol Clube (SP) players
Sociedade Esportiva e Recreativa Caxias do Sul players
Clube Atlético Sorocaba players
Esporte Clube Vitória players
Sport Club Internacional players
Botafogo de Futebol e Regatas players
Associação Portuguesa de Desportos players
Sport Club do Recife players
Clube Atlético Metropolitano players
Esporte Clube São Bento players
Red Bull Brasil players
Vila Nova Futebol Clube players
Esporte Clube São Bento managers